West Freehold is an unincorporated community and census-designated place (CDP) within Freehold Township, in Monmouth County, New Jersey, United States. As of the 2010 United States Census, the CDP's population was 13,613. Due to the community's close proximity to the Battle of Monmouth, West Freehold is home to several important historical structures, which have been preserved in the 'West Freehold Village Historic District'. The historically preserved Monmouth Battlefield, along with the historic villages of Clarksburg, Englishtown, Smithburg and Tennent are a short distance away.

History
The State of New Jersey became a colony of England on June 24, 1664, after the Duke of York granted a patent to Sir George Carteret and Lord John Berkely for what is now New Jersey.

West Freehold (also historically known as 'Mount's Corner') was settled as early as the late seventeenth century by primarily of English and Scottish Presbyterians, Baptists, and Quakers escaping religious persecution from Scotland and nearby New England. A major transportation artery that was located in West Freehold was "The Burlington Path", a stagecoach route meant to connect Burlington, which was at the time the Capital of West Jersey, and Perth Amboy, which was at the time the Capital of East Jersey. Much of modern day Monmouth Road/West Main Street (County Route 537) coincides in general direction and trajectory with this historic stagecoach route. Many colonial era structures are still standing in the 'West Freehold Village Historic District', near the intersection of West Main Street and Stillwells Corner Road/Wemrock Road.

Mount's Tavern
Today known as Moore's Tavern & Restaurant, this tavern is one of the most famous historical structures in the Township. As a stagecoach stop for "the Burlington Path", there is documentation of the tavern's license being renewed from 1787, suggesting that the tavern was in use prior to that. Moses Mount, a Private during the Revolutionary War and aide to George Washington, was the inn's first keeper.

The Levi Solomon Farmstead

The township in its early days was a place of refuge for persecuted religious groups, such as Presbyterians, Baptists, and Quakers. The Solomon family were some of New Jersey's earliest Jewish settlers. They settled on a large piece of farmland, roughly where much of the modern day shopping center 'Mount's Corner' is located, as early as 1720. During the Battle of Monmouth, their dwelling had suffered significant damage from invading British troops. Luckily, matriarch Hannah Solomon, who was widowed, and her two sons were able to save their house after it was set on fire. The original barn that was built on the farm in the 1800s is now the location of the Monmouth County Jewish Heritage Museum; "dedicated to the promotion of public awareness of the county’s Jewish heritage for the education and enjoyment of both children and adults."

West Freehold Schoolhouse
Located at what is now Wemrock Road, adjacent to West Main Street, this schoolhouse was built in 1848 and educated the children that lived within the community until 1937. The property was part of the Rulif R. Schanck Farmstead, which is now the Elizabeth Oakley Farm (Museum).

Walker, Combs, Hartshorne, Oakley Farmstead

Operated for centuries, this property is the earliest remaining farmstead in Freehold and is one of the oldest preserved structures in Monmouth County. Since then, the farmstead had been transferred/sold by multiple families including; Barclay, Reid, Bowne, Clark, Walker, Combs, Schanck, Hartshorne, and Oakley.

By 1981, the farmstead was the largest operating farm in Monmouth County. At that time, Elizabeth Oakley was the last to inhabit inside the structure and was fascinated in the home's rich history. She worked hard to preserve it, having accomplished her life's goal in having the farm be placed in the National Register of Historic Places in 1990.

Toll House

The Toll House located on the property of the Walker, Combs, Hartshorne, Oakley Farmstead is one of only two remaining toll houses in New Jersey. Built in ca. 1850, it was owned and operated by a group of farmers living along "the Burlington Path". The toll separated two sides of the two-lane stagecoach route; the side of the tollroad heading southwest towards Smithburg was known as the 'Freehold-Smithburg Turnpike' and the other side of the tollroad heading northeast towards 'Elk's Point' (what is now Freehold Borough).

Community
There are many residential neighborhoods in West Freehold, consisting of various different types of single-family homes. The two largest neighborhoods, are Stonehurst East and Stonehurst West. The homes in Stonehurst were primarily built in the 1960s and 1970s, on large swaths of former farmland.

 is a mixed-use lifestyle center centrally located near County Route 537. The gated community features luxurious condominiums that were built in the 1980s and 1990s, along with a wide array of amenities offered to its residents. The Raintree Town Center is the shopping center for its residents and for non-residents, anchored by Stop & Shop, Hallmark, Starbucks, and other storefronts.

Geography
According to the United States Census Bureau, the CDP had a total area of 5.927 square miles (15.350 km2), including 5.913 square miles (15.314 km2) of land and 0.014 square miles (0.036 km2) of water (0.24%).

Demographics

Census 2010

Census 2000
As of the 2000 United States Census there were 12,498 people, 4,659 households, and 3,429 families living in the CDP. The population density was 822.1/km2 (2,130.3/mi2). There were 4,740 housing units at an average density of 311.8/km2 (807.9/mi2). The racial makeup of the CDP was 90.68% White, 2.46% African American, 0.15% Native American, 4.28% Asian, 0.02% Pacific Islander, 1.13% from other races, and 1.27% from two or more races. Hispanic or Latino of any race were 5.38% of the population.

There were 4,659 households, out of which 32.9% had children under the age of 18 living with them, 63.1% were married couples living together, 7.8% had a female householder with no husband present, and 26.4% were non-families. 22.6% of all households were made up of individuals, and 6.4% had someone living alone who was 65 years of age or older. The average household size was 2.62 and the average family size was 3.10.

In the CDP the population was spread out, with 23.8% under the age of 18, 5.3% from 18 to 24, 29.4% from 25 to 44, 28.1% from 45 to 64, and 13.4% who were 65 years of age or older. The median age was 40 years. For every 100 females, there were 92.2 males. For every 100 females age 18 and over, there were 88.1 males.

The median income for a household in the CDP was $72,577, and the median income for a family was $87,609. Males had a median income of $62,074 versus $36,563 for females. The per capita income for the CDP was $33,218. About 3.7% of families and 4.7% of the population were below the poverty line, including 6.0% of those under age 18 and 5.4% of those age 65 or over.

Infrastructure

Transportation
New Jersey Transit provides local bus transportation on the 307 route.  It also provides bus transportation to the Port Authority Bus Terminal in Midtown Manhattan on the 139 route, and to the Newark/Jersey City/Hoboken area on the 67 route. Major roads that run through the CDP include Monmouth Road/West Main Street (County Route 537) within the heart of the community and home to numerous businesses, Elton-Adelphia Road (County Route 524) on the community's southern edge near Turkey Swamp Park, U.S. Route 9, which also happens to feature numerous businesses, on the eastern edge, New Jersey Route 79 at the northeastern corner, and the New Jersey Route 33 freeway, known as the "Freehold Bypass", on the community's northern edge with interchanges at Wemrock Road, CR 537, and US 9/Route 79.

Healthcare
CentraState Medical Center is affiliated with Rutgers Robert Wood Johnson Medical School. The facility has 287 beds and is part of CentraState Healthcare System, the county's fourth-largest employer. It is located on West Main Street (County Route 537).

Nearby historic communities
 Adelphia in Howell Township
 The Cassville Crossroads Historic District in Jackson Township
 Clarksburg in Millstone Township
 Dayton in South Brunswick
 Dutch Neck in West Windsor Township
 Jerseyville in Howell Township
 Lincroft in Middletown Township
 The Livingston Avenue Historic District in New Brunswick
 Marlboro in Marlboro Township, along with a detailed list of Historic Sites in Marlboro Township
 The Middletown Village Historic District in Middletown Township
 The Monmouth Battlefield Historic District in Freehold Township and Manalapan Township
 Monmouth Junction in South Brunswick
 The Ocean Grove Historic District in Neptune Township
 Old Bridge in East Brunswick
 Perrineville in Millstone Township
 Plainsboro Center in Plainsboro Township
 Princeton Junction in West Windsor Township
 The Road Up Raritan Historic District in Piscataway
 Tennent in Manalapan Township
 Wayside in Tinton Falls and Ocean Township

References

Neighborhoods in Freehold Township, New Jersey
Census-designated places in Monmouth County, New Jersey